Merv Gillmer (1924-2016) was an Australian professional rugby league footballer who played in the 1940s. He played for Manly-Warringah in the NSWRL competition. Gillmer was a foundation player for Manly-Warringah featuring in the club's first season and first game.

Background
Gillmer grew up in Newtown and played with the local Brookvale rugby league club before serving in the Australian Army for 2 years during World War II.

Playing career
Gillmer played in Manly's first ever game on April 12, 1947, against Western Suburbs at Brookvale Oval. Manly lost the game 15-13 even though Manly had scored more tries than Wests. Gillmer is credited with kicking the first goals for the club.

Manly would go on to finish second last on the table above Parramatta during their inaugural year avoiding the wooden spoon by 2 competition points. In 1948, Gillmer finished as the club's top point scorer as Manly finished second last again avoiding the wooden spoon by a single competition point. Gillmer retired at the end of the 1949 season.

References

Manly Warringah Sea Eagles players
Rugby league centres
Rugby league fullbacks
Rugby league wingers
1924 births
2016 deaths